Enrico Viarisio (3 December 1897 – 1 November 1967) was an Italian theatre and cinema actor.

Biography
Equipped of a fine and elegant humour, Viarisio was discovered by actress Paola Pezzaglia, who cast him at 19 as "brillante" in her own theatre company.

His career continued with the role of amoroso or male lover in the Carini-Gentili-Betrone theatre company, then passed to Talli-Melato-Betrone, Antonio Gandusio, Dyne Galli, and Nino Besozzi, and the Merlini-Cialente-Bagni company.  To raise the company's small profits, Viarisio became the repertory comedian.

Bourgeois audiences appreciated Viarisio's "brilliance" — richly communicative, effervescent, and perfectly to their comfort — in amusing light comedies.  In the sentimental comedies and white-telephone cinema of the 1930s, Viarisio was a constant figure, with his moustache and his black, shining hair combed to the back.  He was the elegant interpreter of various pleasant stories adapted to film from the stage, such as Non ti conosco più (1936) by Nunzio Malasomma, L'uomo che sorride (1936) and Questi ragazzi (1937) by Mario Mattoli.  Often he remained in the limits of the genre, but in some cases showed admirable creativity in his performances, keeping them fresh and memorable.  This can be seen to best advantage in films like Il cappello a tre punte (1934) by Mario Camerini, Cavalleria (1936) by Goffredo Alessandrini and Quattro passi fra le nuvole (1942) by Allesandro Blasetti.

During the postwar period he was dedicated above all to the revue, playing opposite Wanda Osiris (Domani è sempre domenica, 1946–47;  Si stava meglio domani, 1947–48; Il diavolo custode, 1950–51) and Isa Barzizza (Valentina, 1955).  In the 1950s and '60s he lent his impeccable style and his sense of irony to television as well.  Still memorable is his participation in Carosello in the spot for "ALEMAGNA"(on the air from 1957 to 1965).  He remains known for his signature phrase, "Ullalà è una cuccagna!"

Selected filmography

Actor

Paprika, (1933) - Massimo Bonelli
The Girl with the Bruise, (1933)
L'impiegata di papà, (1933) - Graphologist
Tempo massimo, (1934) - Alfredo Martinelli
La provincialina, (1934) - Il direttore del teatro
Kiki di Raffaello Matarazzo, (1934) - Napoleone - il domestico
The Three-Cornered Hat, (1934) - Garduna
 The Wedding March (1934)
 Territorial Militia (1935) - Gasparri
Music in the Square (1936) - Noccolini
Amo te sola, regia di Mario Mattoli (1936) - Avvocato Piccoli
Cavalry, (1936) - Sottotenente Rolla
Thirty Seconds of Love, (1936) - Tullio Siriani - suo marito
Sette giorni all'altro mondo, (1936) - Cesare Rosselli
Non ti conosco più, (1936) - Paolo Malpieri
 White Amazons (1936) - Simone Gualtieri
L'uomo che sorride, (1936) - Commendator Ercole Piazza
Questi ragazzi, (1937) - Giangiacomo Pastori
The Castiglioni Brothers, (1937) - Avvocato De Ambrosio
 The Two Misanthropists, (1937) - Marcello, parrucchiere
Gli uomini non sono ingrati, (1937) - Aladar Toth
 The Last Days of Pompeo (1937) - Pompeo Quarantini
Il trionfo dell'amore (1938) - Giangiacomo
Il destino in tasca, (1938) - Camillo Duffignani
Amicizia, (1938) - Roberto Sandi
La dama bianca, (1938) - Savelli
Duetto vagabondo, (1938) - Toto 
Ai vostri ordini, signora, (1939) - Paolo Vernisset
La bionda sotto chiave, (1939) - Pick
 Two Million for a Smile (1939) - Mister Giacomo Perotti / Martino Bo
I've Lost My Husband!, (1939) - Mattia
L'amore si fa così, (1939) - Max Dupont / Narciso Mimosa
L'eredità in corsa, (1939) - Il parucchiere
Le sorprese del vagone letto, (1940) - L'avvocato Marini
 The Hussar Captain, (1940) - Varady, ex-capitano degli ussari
Non mi sposo più, (1942) - Barkas
Finalmente soli, (1942) - Benedetto Bodengo
Quattro passi fra le nuvole, (1942) - Magnaschi, il rappresentante farmaceutico
Annabella's Adventure, (1943) - Il padre di Annabella
 Harlem (1943) - Pat
Sad Loves, (1943) - Adriano Rainetti
Gli assi della risata, (1943) - Edoardo 'Dodò' Piccioni (segment "Non chiamarmi Dodò!")
La maschera e il volto (1943) - L'avvocato Luciano
Ti conosco, mascherina, (1943) - Il barone Liborio Mellifluo
Circo equestre Za-bum, (1944) - (segment "Gelosia")
Ippocampo, (1945) - Camillo
What a Distinguished Family (1945) - Civil State Officer
Uno tra la folla, (1946) - Il capufficio
Ti ritroverò, (1949) - Don Giuseppe
Little Lady, (1949) - Comm. Gegé Lapicella
Botta e risposta, (1950)
Prima comunione, (1950) - L'uomo del filobus
 Women and Brigands (1950) - Cardinal Ruffo
 The Transporter, (1950) - Georges Durand
 The Knight Has Arrived! (1950) - Il Ministro
Cameriera bella presenza offresi..., (1951) - L'amico di Marchetti
Era lui... sì! sì!, (1951) - Dott. Furgoni
Napoleone, (1951)
Il Microfono è vostro, (1951) - commendator Michele Variani
 The Legend of the Piave (1952) - Caporale Mainardi
 Sunday Heroes (1952) - Cerchio - the radio commentator
Beauties on Motor Scooters, (1952) - Carletti
Noi due soli, (1952) - Il presidente
Siamo tutti inquilini, directed by Mario Mattoli (1953) - Sassi
Stazione Termini, (1953) - Cheerful telegram man (uncredited)
I vitelloni, (1953) - Signor Rubini
Martin Toccaferro, (1953)
Cavalcade of Song, (1953)
Il più comico spettacolo del mondo, (1953) - Il presentatore
It Happened in the Park, (1953) - L'ingegnere - cliente di Elvira (segment: Concorso di bellezza)
Lasciateci in pace, (1953)
Dieci canzoni d'amore da salvare, (1953) - Giulio
Tempi nostri, (1954) - Il marito
Cose da pazzi, (1954) - Professor Ruiz
Neapolitan Carousel, (1954) - Spanish tourist
Pellegrini d'amore, (1954) - Constantin
 Milanese in Naples (1954) - Professor Clemente Simoni
La tua donna, (1954)
We Two Alone, (1955) - The Chairman
Gli ultimi cinque minuti, (1955) - Francesco, il maggiordomo
Destinazione Piovarolo, (1955) - De Fassi
Wives and Obscurities (1956) - Evaristo
Buongiorno primo amore, (1957) - Nardone
Un amore senza fine, (1958)
The Love Specialist, (1958) - Il zio di Piero
Le bellissime gambe di Sabrina, (1958) - Il commendatore
I Teddy boys della canzone, (1960) - Commendator Filippo Amato
Gli scontenti, (1961) - Il sindaco
Le magnifiche sette, (1961) - Il generale Chalette
Pesci d'oro e bikini d'argento, (1961)
Freddy and the Millionaire (1961) - Arzt
Fuori la guardia, (1961) - Dottore
Lo smemorato di Collegno, (1962) - Il Ministro
The Shortest Day, (1963) - Erede Siciliano (uncredited)
In ginocchio da te, (1964) - Enzo - the Colonel
Napoleone a Firenze, (1964)
Io uccido, tu uccidi, (1965) - Marchese Ciccillo Pozzuoli (segment "La danza delle ore")
Se non avessi più te, (1965) - The Colonel
Non son degno di te, (1965) - Enzo
Mi vedrai tornare, (1966) - Ammiraglio Aleardi
Perdono, (1966) - Car driver
Non stuzzicate la zanzara, (1967) - Gavazzeni Scotti
Stasera mi butto, (1967) - Father of Fefè (final film role)

References

Sources
This article is largely a translation of "Enrico Viarisio Biografia" at Mymovies.it.

External links
 

Italian male film actors
Italian male stage actors
1897 births
1967 deaths
Actors from Turin
20th-century Italian male actors